Yeşilova Kemal Aktaş Stadium  is a football stadium in Küçükçekmece district of Istanbul, Turkey. It is owned by the district municipality. It is the home ground of Galatasaray S.K. women's football team.

The stadium is situated at Barbaros Ave. 30 in the Gültepe neighborhood of Küçükçekmece.  Opened in 2011, it is owned by the Küçükçekmece Municipality. Formerly known as the Yeşilova Stadium, it was renamed in 2013 after the district resident Kemal Aktaş (1967–2008), a Galatasaray youth setup and former profession footballer died from heart attack during a friendly football game.

The stadium has a seating capacity of 1,500 spectators. The pitch with the dimensions  has artificial turf ground.

Gallery

References

Sports venues in Istanbul
Football venues in Turkey
Sports venues completed in 2011
2011 establishments in Turkey
Galatasaray S.K. (women's football)
Küçükçekmece